Spialia geron is a butterfly in the family Hesperiidae. It is found in Afghanistan and western Pakistan.

References

Spialia
Butterflies described in 1893
Butterflies of Asia